Hayes Lake State Park is a state park in northwestern Minnesota, United States, near the city of Roseau.

Wildlife
Black bears are residents of the northern forest and are seen by visitors occasionally in this park. Other mammalian species that roam in and around this park are moose, fisher, porcupine, bobcat, river otter, raccoon, deer,  beaver, red fox, marten, Canadian lynx, mink, and timber wolf. Loons, herons, grebes, and other water birds can be observed by bird watchers along the shoreline.

References

External links
Hayes Lake State Park

1971 establishments in Minnesota
Protected areas established in 1971
Protected areas of Roseau County, Minnesota
State parks of Minnesota